This is a list of traffic circles in New Jersey. The U.S. state of New Jersey at one point had a total of 101 traffic circles, 44 of which were part of state roads. However, the number has shrunk as traffic circles have been phased out by the New Jersey Department of Transportation. In the 1920s and 1930s, New Jersey felt that traffic circles were an efficient way for moving traffic through three or more intersecting roads. Built in 1925, the first traffic circle in New Jersey was the Airport Circle in Pennsauken.  Many of these interchanges are rotaries in design, as opposed to the more successful modern roundabout.
 
As suburban and rural populations grew New Jersey's traffic circles became outdated. The increased number of drivers on the roads resulted in traffic circles being more likely to hinder traffic than help it. Increased number of vehicles and faster traffic speeds made traffic circles more dangerous and accidents common. Many traffic circles became notorious for having frequent accidents and being confusing, especially for non-locals. Starting around the 1970s, the New Jersey Department of Transportation began phasing out traffic circles. Common methods of eliminating traffic circles are building a road through the circle, adding traffic lights, and the use of grade separation.

Modified traffic circles are intersections where parts or all of the original circle still exist as a major part of the intersection.

References

External links
 nj.com gallery of traffic circles

Traffic circles in New Jersey
Traffic circles in New Jersey